Addie Horton is a fictional character on the television soap opera Days of Our Lives, portrayed by Patricia Huston from November 10, 1965, to March 9, 1966, and Patricia Barry from April 19, 1971, to June 28, 1974. Barry reprised her role as Addie for one episode on December 18, 1974.

Storylines
Addie Williams is the daughter of Tom and Alice Horton. She has four other siblings; her twin brother, Tommy; and Mickey, Bill and Marie Horton. She was first married to wealthy banker Ben Olson and had two children with him, Steve and Julie Williams. Ben and Addie left Salem in 1966, but Addie returned to Salem in 1971 after Ben's death. Addie disapproved of Julie's fiancé, Doug Williams, but ended up marrying him on the night that he was meant to marry Julie, leaving Julie crushed.

Addie soon discovered that she was ill with Leukumia and that she was pregnant. Despite her doctor's warnings, she decided to keep her baby and let the cancer take its course instead of fighting it and harming the baby. Addie soon gave birth to her and Doug's first and only child together, a baby girl named Hope.  Soon afterwards though Addie was deathly ill and soon realized that she wouldn't live long. So as she was taking a walk one day with her daughter, a car spun out towards them.  Addie pushed her daughter's stroller to safety and let the car hit her so her daughter would survive, while Addie was instantly killed.

References

External links
Addie at soapcentral.com

Days of Our Lives characters
Television characters introduced in 1965
Fictional housewives
Female characters in television
Fictional twins
Horton family